Kenneth Patrick Weatherwax (September 29, 1955 – December 7, 2014) was an American child actor best known for having played Pugsley Addams on The Addams Family.

Biography
Weatherwax was born in Los Angeles into a show-business family. His aunt was actress and dancer Ruby Keeler.  Beginning in 1954, his half-brother, Joey D. Vieira, played Porky on the first three seasons of Lassie under the stage name of Donald Keeler.  Ken Weatherwax's uncles were Frank and Rudd Weatherwax, Lassie's trainers and owners of the first dog to play the role. 

Weatherwax made his acting debut in the early 1960s when he was age 9, playing a boy named Chester in a commercial for Gleem toothpaste. He was cast as Pugsley Addams on The Addams Family. The program ran for two seasons from 1964 to 1966. After its cancellation, Weatherwax found he was typecast as Pugsley and lost interest in acting. He entered the U.S. Army at age 17 and, at age 21, he reprised the role of Pugsley in the 1977 reunion film Halloween with the New Addams Family. He established a career behind the camera as a movie studio grip and set builder, and made occasional appearances at Addams Family-related events with former costar Lisa Loring, who had played Pugsley's younger sister Wednesday Addams on the show. The two remained lifelong friends until Weatherwax's death.

Death
Weatherwax died on December 7, 2014, of a heart attack at his home in West Hills, California, at the age of 59. The staff at Dearly Departed Tours & Artifact Museum raised the funds to have Weatherwax interred in Valhalla Memorial Park Cemetery in North Hollywood in 2017. A portion of his cremated remains are located at Dearly Departed Tours & Artifact Museum.

Filmography

References

External links

1955 births
2014 deaths
20th-century American male actors
American male child actors
American male television actors
Burials at Valhalla Memorial Park Cemetery
Male actors from Los Angeles
United States Army soldiers
Death in California
People from West Hills, Los Angeles
Military personnel from California